Miranda Yap (August 1948 – 14 October 2015) was a professor in the Chemical and Biomolecular Engineering Department of the National University of Singapore, and the Executive Director of the Bioprocessing Technology Institute at the Agency for Science, Technology and Research of Singapore (A*STAR).

Education
Yap earned her PhD in chemical engineering at the University of Toronto in 1979; she had previously received a basic degree in applied chemistry from University of Singapore, now known as the  National University of Singapore  (NUS), and a master's degree in biochemical engineering at University College London in 1973.

Career
She returned to Singapore in 1982 to join NUS. With a government grant, she helped to establish the Bioprocessing Technology Unit (BTU) in 1990, which was later renamed as Bioprocessing Technology Centre (BTC) in 1995 as a National research centre for bioprocessing technology with Yap as the Director. In 2003, the centre was renamed the Bioprocessing Technology Institute (BTI) and relocated to the new Biopolis research centre in Singapore. She also founded two organisations, the Centre for Natural Product Research (now called Merlion Pharmaceuticals) and the Biopharmaceutical Manufacturing Technology Center (now called A-Bio Pharma). During her career, she published 58 papers in peer-reviewed journals.

In February 2006, Yap was named a Foreign Associate to the United States National Academy of Engineering. Her election citation noted "her outstanding achievements in education, research and management in the field of mammalian cell culture". She is the only female scientist and second Singaporean to be elected to the academy. She was awarded the President's Science and Technology Medal in 2009, becoming the first female winner of Singapore's most prestigious science prize.

Yap was named Executive Director of A*STAR Graduate Academy (A*GA) in November 2006, focusing on talent management and development in partnership with Imperial College London.

She has been a lecturer in the Advanced Course in Cell Technology at the University of Minnesota, which describes her as:

Prof Miranda Yap is the founding Director of BTI, which is the pivotal institution in advancing Singapore’s bioprocessing research and plays a critical role in Singapore’s success in the expansion of biomanufacturing industry. She has been instrumental in nurturing BTI’s growth; transforming it from its nascent days as the Bioprocessing Technology Unit in National University of Singapore to a renowned international institution today. She has trained numerous PhD and master students in many areas of biotechnology. In cell culture technology her work has spanned from early work on cellular physiology to recent transcriptome and proteome analysis for cell engineering.

Personal
Yap was married to Dr Yap Kian Tiong and died in Singapore on October 14, 2015 five years after suffering from an aneurysm.

References

1948 births
2015 deaths
Alumni of University College London
Foreign associates of the National Academy of Engineering
National University of Singapore alumni
Academic staff of the National University of Singapore
Singaporean women engineers
Singaporean chemical engineers
Singaporean people of Chinese descent
University of Toronto alumni
20th-century women engineers
21st-century women engineers